Warrender is a surname. Notable people with the surname include:

Bobby Warrender (1929–2003), Scottish professional footballer
Danny Warrender (born 1986), former English professional footballer
Harold Warrender (1903–1953), British actor
Jim Warrender (1931–2012), former football (soccer) player who represented New Zealand at international level
John Warrender, 2nd Baron Bruntisfield MC OBE TD (1921–2007), Scottish soldier, farmer and Conservative politician
Patrick Warrender (1731–1799), Scottish soldier and politician
Sir George Warrender, 1st Baronet (1658–1722), Scottish merchant and politician
Sir George Warrender, 4th Baronet PC, FRS (1782–1849), Scottish politician
Sir George Warrender, 7th Baronet K.C.B. K.C.V.O. (1860–1917), vice-admiral in the British Royal Navy during World War I
Sir Patrick Warrender, 3rd Baronet (1731–1799), Scottish soldier and politician
Victor Warrender, 1st Baron Bruntisfield MC PC (1899–1993), Conservative politician

See also
Warrender Baths, swimming pool and fitness complex in Marchmont, Edinburgh